The Pomier Caves are a series of 55 caves located north of San Cristobal in the south of the Dominican Republic. They contain the largest collection of rock art in the Caribbean created since 2,000 years ago primarily by the Taíno people but also the Carib people and the Igneri, the pre-Columbian indigenous inhabitants of the Bahamas, Greater Antilles, and some of the Lesser Antilles. These caves have been damaged by the uncontrolled mining of limestone nearby.

Importance

Archaeologists have described the importance of preserving these caves which were first discovered in 1851. The caves contain approximately 6,000 drawings, carvings and pictographs of birds, fish, reptiles, and human figures. The paintings were drawn with charcoal mixed with animal fat. Archaeologists say that the paintings have been protected by the natural humidity provided by the depth of the caves.

Protection
In 1996, the Anthropological Reserve of Cuevas de Borbón in San Cristóbal was enlarged to protect the El Pomier caves from limestone quarrying. This raised their protection category, and included them in the National System of Protected Areas, through the General Law on Environmental and Natural Resources, Law 64-00, which also gave instructions to the Secretariat de Estate supervising its application.

Given the international importance of these caves for the study of Amerindian groups that inhabited the Caribbean Islands for nearly 8,000 years prior to the arrival of western culture, the caves are being considered for the unique category of Capital Prehistoric De Las Antillas (Prehistoric Capital of the Antilles) and the rehabilitation of one of its caves and its surrounding area to match this new category.

See also
 Carib
 Igneri
 Taíno

Notes

External links

 Taíno Cave Art Under Siege
 Taíno Caves in the Dominican Republic (photo essay, archived)
 Taino Indian Sites
 Caribbean Reporters and Media House Scoop Up CMEx Media Awards

Indigenous topics of the Caribbean
Caves of the Dominican Republic
Carib people
Taíno
Rock art in North America
Geography of San Cristóbal Province
Archaeological sites in the Dominican Republic
Caves of the Caribbean